The Ross Dependency is a region of Antarctica defined by a sector originating at the South Pole, passing along longitudes 160° east to 150° west, and terminating at latitude 60° south. It is claimed by New Zealand, a claim accepted only by the other six countries with territorial claims in Antarctica. Under the 1961 Antarctic Treaty, of which all territorial claimants are signatories, including New Zealand, all claims are held in abeyance.  Article IV states: "No acts or activities taking place while the present Treaty is in force shall constitute a basis for asserting, supporting or denying a claim to territorial sovereignty in Antarctica or create any rights of sovereignty in Antarctica".

The Dependency takes its name from Sir James Clark Ross, who discovered the Ross Sea, and includes part of Victoria Land, and most of the Ross Ice Shelf. Ross, Balleny, Scott and Roosevelt Islands also form part of the Dependency.

History of claim 
Following his discovery of Victoria Land in 1841, James Clark Ross took possession of this territory, along with the surrounding sea, on behalf of Britain. On 30 July 1923, the British Government passed an Order in Council under the British Settlements Act 1887, which defined the current borders of the Ross Dependency as follows:

The Order in Council then went on to appoint the governor-general and commander-in-chief of New Zealand as the governor of the territory. This Order in Council was published in the New Zealand Gazette on 16 August 1923, and on 14 November 1923, the governor-general issued regulations extending New Zealand law to the Ross Dependency.

After the Order in Council was read in the New Zealand House of Representatives by the Prime Minister of New Zealand William Massey, a clarification was made by the Attorney-General Sir Francis Bell in the legislative council. Bell stated that:

It has been said that the Order in Council contained no suggestion of a transfer to New Zealand of the United Kingdom's claim, but the fact remains that the territory is administered by the Government of New Zealand. Technically, the claim is that of the monarch and they can exercise it through any of their governments.

At an Imperial Conference in 1930, it was agreed that the governors-general of the Dominions would be appointed by the king on the advice of the Dominion in question. And following the passing of the Statute of Westminster in 1931 (which was adopted in full by New Zealand in 1947), the Government of the United Kingdom relinquished all control over the government of New Zealand. This however had no bearing on the obligations of the governor-general of New Zealand in their capacity as governor of the Ross Dependency on the appointment of the Government of the United Kingdom. Then in the year 1959, the Antarctic Treaty was signed by twelve nations, which included both the United Kingdom and New Zealand.

Geography and habitation 

The actual amount of land mass claimed is not large; most of the area defined as being in the Ross Dependency is either in the Ross Sea or the Antarctic Ocean. It is the second-smallest of the claims which were made prior to the implementation of the Antarctic Treaty System and the suspension of all territorial claims to Antarctica proper. Officers of the Government of the Ross Dependency are annually appointed to run the Dependency. The New Zealand Geographic Board has named many features within the Dependency.

The scientific bases of Scott Base (New Zealand), McMurdo Station (US), Zucchelli Station (Italy) and Jang Bogo Station (South Korea) are the only permanently occupied human habitations in the area, though Amundsen–Scott South Pole Station (US) is partially within the territory and dependent on logistics operations based in New Zealand. China is establishing a year-round research station at Inexpressible Island in Terra Nova Bay of the Ross Sea that is expected to open in 2022. The Dependency has access to US Antarctic Program maintained snow runways at Williams Field and Phoenix Airfield, and – depending on conditions and time of year – the Ice Runway. This guarantees accessibility by wheeled and ski equipped aircraft year round.

From 1969 to 1995 New Zealand operated a summer-only base called Vanda Station in the Dry Valley area of the Dependency.

Greenpeace maintained its own Antarctic station in the Ross Dependency called World Park Base from 1987 to 1992, which was on Ross Island. As this base was a non-governmental entity, the official policy of the signatory nations of the Antarctic Treaty was not to give any support or assistance to it.

Other events
In 1979, an Air New Zealand sightseeing flight crashed into the slopes of Mount Erebus killing all 257 people on board. It was the most deadly air crash in the history of both Antarctica and New Zealand (see Mount Erebus disaster).

In the summer of 1985, when the British non-governmental exploratory vessel Southern Quest sank in the Ross Sea, the United States Coast Guard helicopters rescued the crew, who were taken to McMurdo Station. The British expedition was criticised by scientists in the Antarctic because the rescue and return of the crew disrupted their work.

In 2006, the New Zealand police reported that jurisdictional issues prevented them issuing warrants for potential American witnesses who were reluctant to testify during the Christchurch Coroner's investigation into the poisoning death of Rodney Marks at the South Pole base.

Postage stamps

See also 

 Territorial claims in Antarctica
 Timeline of New Zealand's links with Antarctica

Notes

External links 

 Antarctica and the Southern Ocean  – NZ Ministry of Foreign Affairs and Trade. Outline of NZ's involvement
 Antarctica New Zealand – Crown entity charged with administering, developing, and managing Ross Dependency
 50 years of Scott Base 
 History – From University of Canterbury
 Stamps of Ross Dependency
 Map of Ross Dependency (central part)
 Scientific Research by NIWA in Antarctica
 Dominion Post Photos of Antarctica: enter, go to Categories:Places;Antarctica
 Antarctica and New Zealand, NZ Ministry for Culture and Heritage
 Quartermain, L. B. (1971) New Zealand and the Antarctic. Wellington.

 
States and territories established in 1923
Dependent territories of New Zealand
1923 establishments in Antarctica